Sango Festival is an annual festival held among the Yoruba people in honour of Sango, a thunder and fire deity who was a warrior and the third king of the Oyo Empire after succeeding Ajaka his elder brother. Renamed in 2013 to World Sango Festival by the government of Oyo State, the festival is usually held in August at the palace of the Alaafin of Oyo and also observed in over forty countries around the world.

History

The Sango Festival celebrations can be traced back to 1,000 years ago following the departure of Sango, a popular Yoruba òrìṣà who is widely regarded as the founding father of the Oyo people

Sango was a notable strong ruler and magician who became king of the Oyo Empire after succeeding his elder brother who was perceived to be a "weak ruler". Believed to bring prosperity to the people of the Oyo Empire during his reign, Sango's death has been linked to different mythical stories. It is believed that Sango committed suicide by hanging himself in order to avoid humiliation from one of his powerful chiefs who ordered Sango to vacate his throne or face war. Sango was said to have reigned for just seven years as King over Oyo but with such a powerful leadership he was counted as the best King ever in the history of Oyo rulers. During the 2021 festivity, the Ayabas i.e. the wife's of King boast of how they stopped rain from falling which would have disturbed the ceremony after consulting the Yemoja and the Sango priest. Also, the festival is said to start with Iwure Agba meaning the prayer of the elders that is usually led by the Sango priest.

Significance
Since its renaming in 2013, the event which is usually held in August and runs for a week attracts over 20,000 spectators around the world including Brazil, Cuba, Trinidad and Tobago and the Caribbean. The event which is recognized by UNESCO, is organized to facilitate the home-coming of the Yorubas in the diaspora and also celebrate Sango who is regarded as the greatest hero in the history of the Yoruba race.

How sango festival is celebrated

The Sango Festival is a 10 days event, which is marked with pomp and pageantry. Worshippers and visitors can be seen in a happy mood. The worshippers are usually adorned with white or red attire. Some of the activities lined up for the festival include: Ayo competition, Ogun Ajobo day, Oya day, Aje Oloja day, Iyemoja day, Esin Elejo day and Sango Oyo day.

See also
 Festivals in Nigeria

Further reading

References

Festivals in Nigeria
August events
Annual events in Nigeria
Yoruba culture
Yoruba festivals